Anatoli Andreyevich Stukalov (born 3 April 1991) is a former Russian football player. He also holds Kazakhstani citizenship.

Career
In February 2013, Stukalov moved from FC Tobol to Turan Tovuz.

He made his professional debut in the Russian Professional Football League for FC Arsenal-2 Tula on 11 September 2014 in a game against FC Fakel Voronezh.

References

External links
 
 
 

1991 births
Living people
People from Odesa Oblast
Russian footballers
Association football defenders
Russian expatriate footballers
Expatriate footballers in Azerbaijan
FC Tobol players
Turan-Tovuz IK players
PFC CSKA Moscow players
FC Arsenal Tula players
Kazakhstan Premier League players
Azerbaijan Premier League players